Kani Mamer (also Romanized as Kānī Māmer and Kanī Māmar; also known as Khānī Moḩammad and Khani Muhammad) is a village in Beleh Keh Rural District, Alut District, Baneh County, Kurdistan Province, Iran. At the 2006 census, its population was 47, in 9 families. The village is populated by Kurds.

References 

Towns and villages in Baneh County
Kurdish settlements in Kurdistan Province